The Pest is a lost 1919 silent American comedy-drama film directed by Christy Cabanne, starring Mabel Normand, John Bowers, and Charles K. Gerrard, and released on April 20, 1919.

Cast list
 Mabel Normand as Jigs
 John Bowers as Gene Giles
 Charles K. Gerard as John Harland
 Alec B. Francis as Judge Fisher
 Leota Lorraine as Blanche Fisher
 Jack Curtis as Asher Blodgett
 Pearl Elmore as Amy Blodgett
 James Bradbury as "Noisy" Wilson
 Vera Lewis as Housekeeper

References

External links

Films directed by Christy Cabanne
American silent feature films
Lost American films
Goldwyn Pictures films
American black-and-white films
1910s English-language films
1919 comedy-drama films
1919 lost films
Lost comedy-drama films
1919 films
1910s American films
Silent American comedy-drama films